Lisbet Jagedal, born 17 July 1964, is a Swedish singer who participated at Melodifestivalen 1990 with the song Varje natt which ended up third.

She has also scored Svensktoppen hits as a solo singer with the song "Varje natt" (1990) as well as together with Pools orkester; "Du har det där" (1993) and "För varje andetag" (1994).

References 

1964 births
Swedish women singers
Living people
Dansband singers
Schlager musicians
Melodifestivalen contestants of 1990